Eyvashan Golstan (also Romanized as Eyvashān Golestān; also known as Eyvashān, ‘Eyvashān Seyl, ‘Eyvashān Sīl, and Yebāsūn) is a village in Qaedrahmat Rural District, Zagheh District, Khorramabad County, Lorestan Province, Iran. At the 2006 census, its population was 48, in 9 families.

References 

Towns and villages in Khorramabad County